Crêpe, also spelled crepe or crape (from the French ) is a silk, wool, or synthetic fiber fabric with a distinctively crisp and crimped appearance. The term "crape" typically refers to a form of the fabric associated specifically with mourning. Crêpe was also historically called "crespe" or "crisp".

It is woven of hard-spun yarn, originally silk "in the gum" (silk from which the sericin had not been removed). There traditionally have been two distinct varieties of the crêpe: soft, Canton or Oriental crêpe, and hard or crisped crêpe.

Types

A

B

C

E

F

G

H

L

M

N

P

R

S

V

Y

See also
 Crêpe paper, paper with similar texture
Momie cloth

References

Bibliography

Woven fabrics
Silk
Death customs